The Injilarija people were an Aboriginal Australian people who lived south of the Gulf of Carpentaria in Queensland, east of the Waanyi, south of the Nguburinji and west of the Mingginda peoples. They are considered extinct.

History
The Gulf Country's Aboriginal peoples were severely affected by the rapid seizure and occupation of their lands by the great pastoral boom of the 1880s. One station at Lawn Hill in Injilarija territory was run by the Melbourne Grammar-educated Jack Watson, whose home had a trophy room with 40 pairs of Aboriginal people's ears nailed to the walls, which he would show proudly to visitors. 

The traditional lands of the Injilarija are today partially covered by the Boodjamulla National Park (which includes the Lawn Hill region) in the Shire of Burke. They were taken over by right of succession by the Waanyi people, after the Injilariya were deemed to be extinct, around 1880.

Notes and references

Notes

References

    

Aboriginal peoples of Queensland